Shamilia Shontell Connell (born 14 July 1992) is a Barbadian cricketer who represents the West Indies internationally. A right-arm fast bowler, she made her international debut in 2014. She plays domestic cricket for Barbados and Guyana Amazon Warriors.

Career 
Connell made her international debut in September 2014, in a Twenty20 International against New Zealand. Her One Day International (ODI) debut came a few months later, against Australia. However, Connell did her take her first international wicket until October 2015, in an ODI series against Pakistan. She finished with six wickets, the most for her team, which including 3/32 in the fourth ODI. At the 2016 World Twenty20 in India, Connell was a member of the West Indian squad that won their first world title, featuring in all matches at the tournament. She has been compared to retired West Indian fast bowler Joel Garner, in that she is "tall, dangerously quick, and not scared to bowl bouncers".

In October 2018, Cricket West Indies (CWI) awarded her a women's contract for the 2018–19 season. Later the same month, she was named in the West Indies' squad for the 2018 ICC Women's World Twenty20 tournament in the West Indies. In January 2020, she was named in West Indies' squad for the 2020 ICC Women's T20 World Cup in Australia. 

In May 2021, Connell was awarded with a central contract from Cricket West Indies. In June 2021, she was named in the West Indies' squad across all formats for their home series against Pakistan. She was the highest-wicket taker in the WT20I series picking up five wickets, and was awarded the player of the series.

In October 2021, she was named in the West Indies team for the 2021 Women's Cricket World Cup Qualifier tournament in Zimbabwe. In February 2022, she was named in the West Indies team for the 2022 Women's Cricket World Cup in New Zealand. On 18 March 2022, during the 47th over of the Bangladesh batting against the West Indies at the 2022 Women's Cricket World Cup she collapsed on the field while fielding at midwicket and was immediately taken to the hospital. She had only bowled three overs in the match by the time she collapsed during the course of the match. The very next day, she was discharged from the hospital and it was revealed that she had successfully recovered well in time.

In July 2022, she was named in the Barbados team for the cricket tournament at the 2022 Commonwealth Games in Birmingham, England.

References

External links

 Shamilia Connell at CricketArchive
 Shamilia Connell at ESPNcricinfo

1992 births
Barbadian women cricketers
Living people
West Indian women cricketers
West Indies women One Day International cricketers
West Indies women Twenty20 International cricketers
Guyana Amazon Warriors (WCPL) cricketers
Cricketers at the 2022 Commonwealth Games
Commonwealth Games competitors for Barbados
Barbados women Twenty20 International cricketers